Daniel Chamovitz (דניאל חיימוביץ; born April 18, 1963 ) is an American-born plant geneticist and the 7th President of Ben-Gurion University of the Negev in Beer-Sheva, Israel. Previously he was Dean of the George S. Wise Faculty of Life Sciences at Tel Aviv University, Israel, and the director of the multidisciplinary Manna Center Program in Food Safety and Security.

Biography 
Daniel Chamovitz was born in Pittsburgh, Pennsylvania, and grew up in Aliquippa, Pennsylvania. He began his undergraduate studies at Columbia University in New York City, NY, and then transferred to the Hebrew University of Jerusalem, where he studied plant science. He received his Ph.D. in Genetics in 1992. From 1993 to 1996 he carried out postdoctoral research at Yale University, before accepting a faculty position at Tel Aviv University. In 2002, Chamovitz was a visiting scientist at the Fred Hutchinson Cancer Research Center in Seattle, and he has also been a Visiting Professor at the School of Advanced Agricultural Sciences at Peking University. He founded the interdisciplinary Manna Center Program in Food Safety and Security at Tel Aviv University in 2013, and was Dean of the George S. Wise Faculty of Life Sciences at Tel Aviv University from 2014 to 2018.

Since January 1, 2019, Chamovitz serves as the 7th President of Ben-Gurion University of the Negev in Beer-Sheva, Israel, and holds the university's Miles and Lillian Cahn Chair in Food Security and Plant Science.

Scientific career
During his doctoral research, in the lab of Joseph Hirschberg, Daniel Chamovitz cloned several genes involved in the biosynthesis of beta-carotene. As a postdoctoral fellow in the lab of Xing-Wang Deng at Yale University, he discovered the COP9 Signalosome (CSN) complex. At Tel Aviv University he continued to work on this protein complex to understand its role in regulating plant responses to the environment with both Arabidopsis and Drosophila as model systems. Using genetic, biochemical, molecular and computational approaches, he has shown that CSN is essential for development in both plants and animals and is likely also involved in a number of human diseases, including cancer. His lab has also elucidated the role of the phytochemical indole-3-carbinol in plant development.  Chamovitz has published over 70 scientific papers in peer-reviewed journals with over 6,000 citations listed in Google Scholar. He was also member of the Faculty of 1000, Biology.

He is known for his popular science book What a Plant Knows, which was first published in 2012, with an updated and revised edition appearing in 2017. The book won a silver medal from the Nautilus Book Awards and was listed as one of the Top 10 Science books in Amazon for 2012. What a Plant Knows has been translated and published in 20 countries. The book was also the base for a course with the same name taught on Coursera by Chamovitz to over 100,000 students, beginning in 2013.

Selected awards
 1993 European Molecular Biology Organization Long-term fellowship
 1994 Human Frontier Science Program Postdoctoral fellowship
 1996 Alon Fellowship מלגת אלון for the Integration of Outstanding Faculty, by the Israel Council for Higher Education
 2002 Union for International Cancer Control ICC-American Cancer Society Beginning Investigator Award
 2013 Nautilus Book Awards silver medal 
 2021 Bonei Zion Prize in the field of education

References

External links 
 Interview with Daniel Chamovitz upon assuming office of President of Ben-Gurion University of the Negev
 President's Report 2019
 Personal website and blog
 Losing our Humanities blogpost
 Do Plants Think?
 Plants are intelligent; now what?

Living people
Academic staff of Ben-Gurion University of the Negev
Scientists from Pittsburgh
Academic staff of Tel Aviv University
1963 births
Hebrew University of Jerusalem alumni
Columbia University alumni
American geneticists
21st-century American biologists
Israeli biologists
Presidents of universities in Israel
Israeli Jews
Plant geneticists